WARNING: This article is very contradictory in the fact that it says it is the results of both the 1997 Canadian election and the 2000 Canadian election so we suggest very highly against using this article for any factual information.

This is a seat by seat list of candidates in the 2000 Canadian election.

For more information about the election see 1997 Canadian federal election.

Cabinet Ministers and Party Leaders are denoted in bold

Incumbents who did not seek re-election are denoted with a dagger (†)

Contents 
 1 Newfoundland and Labrador
 2 Prince Edward Island
 3 Nova Scotia
 4 New Brunswick
 5 Quebec
 5.1 Eastern Quebec
 5.2 Côte-Nord and Saguenay
 5.3 Quebec City
 5.4 Central Quebec
 5.5 Eastern Townships
 5.6 Montérégie
 5.7 Eastern Montreal
 5.8 Western Montreal
 5.9 Northern Montreal and Laval
 5.10 Laurentides, Outaouais and Northern Quebec
 6 Ontario
 6.1 Ottawa
 6.2 Eastern Ontario
 6.3 Central Ontario
 6.4 Durham and York
 6.5 Suburban Toronto
 6.6 Central Toronto
 6.7 Brampton, Mississauga and Oakville
 6.8 Hamilton, Burlington and Niagara
 6.9 Midwestern Ontario
 6.10 Southwestern Ontario
 6.11 Northern Ontario
 7 References

Newfoundland and Labrador 
 See also Canadian federal election results in Newfoundland and Labrador
edit

Prince Edward Island 
 See also Canadian federal election results in Prince Edward Island
edit

Nova Scotia 
 See also Canadian federal election results in Nova Scotia
edit

New Brunswick 
 See also Canadian federal election results in New Brunswick
edit

 ^ Vautour defected from the NDP in 1999.

Quebec

Eastern Quebec 
 See also Canadian federal election results in Eastern Quebec
edit

Côte-Nord and Saguenay 
 See also Canadian federal election results in the Côte-Nord and Saguenay
edit

Quebec City 
 See also Canadian federal election results in Quebec City
edit

Central Quebec 
 See also Canadian federal election results in Central Quebec
edit

Eastern Townships 
 See also Canadian federal election results in the Eastern Townships
edit

Montérégie 
 See also Canadian federal election results in Montérégie
edit

Eastern Montreal 
 See also Canadian federal election results in Eastern Montreal
edit

Western Montreal 
 See also Canadian federal election results in Western Montreal
edit

Northern Montreal and Laval 
 See also Canadian federal election results in Northern Montreal and Laval
edit

Laurentides, Outaouais and Northern Quebec 
 See also Canadian federal election results in the Laurentides, Outaouais and Northern Quebec
edit

Ontario

Ottawa 
 See also Canadian federal election results in Ottawa
edit

Eastern Ontario 
 See also Canadian federal election results in Eastern Ontario
edit

Central Ontario 
 See also Canadian federal election results in Central Ontario
edit

Durham and York 
 See also Canadian federal election results in Southern Durham and York
edit

Suburban Toronto 
 See also Canadian federal election results in Suburban Toronto
edit

Central Toronto 
 See also Canadian federal election results in Central Toronto
Template:Canadian federal election, 2000/on-tc

Brampton, Mississauga and Oakville 
 See also Canadian federal election results in Brampton, Mississauga and Oakville
Template:Canadian federal election, 2000/on-bm

Hamilton, Burlington and Niagara 
 See also Canadian federal election results in Hamilton, Burlington and Niagara
Template:Canadian federal election, 2000/on-hn

Midwestern Ontario 
 See also Canadian federal election results in Midwestern Ontario
Template:Canadian federal election, 2000/on-mw

Southwestern Ontario 
 See also Canadian federal election results in Southwestern Ontario
Template:Canadian federal election, 2000/on-sw

Northern Ontario 
 See also Canadian federal election results in Northern Ontario
edit

References 

 
1997